The Windorah Solar Farm is Ergon Energy's first solar farm trial near the town of Windorah in Queensland.
The plant uses five concentrated solar dishes or reflectors which were manufactured and installed by Solar Systems. This is expected to save up to 100,000 litres of diesel fuel per year. The integration of solar farm and diesel power is a first for Ergon Energy.

The dishes contain 112 square mirrors each measuring 1.1 m across. The five solar reflectors sit atop 13 m masts and can rotate 360°. The array will produce about 180 kilowatts of electricity for up to 10 months of the year. The total cost of the project was A$4.5 million with $1 million being provided by the federal government.

The solar farm was opened in December 2008, and on sunny days will supply the total daytime electricity requirements for the town of Windorah, with a population of 100. When the solar power runs low the existing diesel power station provides electricity. Not all of the dishes are used all the time. Some dishes are parked depending on the town's energy requirements.

In 2013, Ergon Energy reported that the plant was operating effectively, with environmental conditions such as dust and wildlife having some impact on the reliability of the solar farm.

See also

List of active power stations in Queensland
Solar Cities in Australia
Solar power in Australia

References

Solar power stations in Queensland